Metastatia pyrrhorhoea is a moth of the subfamily Arctiinae. It was described by Jacob Hübner in 1818. It is found in Guyana and Brazil (Pará), Costa Rica and Panama.

References

 

Arctiinae
Moths described in 1827
Arctiinae of South America